Bachelor of Arts (BA or AB; from the Latin , , or ) is a bachelor's degree awarded for an undergraduate program in the arts, or, in some cases, other disciplines. A Bachelor of Arts degree course is generally completed in three or four years, depending on the country and institution.

 Degree attainment typically takes four years in Afghanistan, Armenia, Azerbaijan, Bangladesh, Brazil, Brunei, China, Egypt, Ghana, Greece, Georgia, Hong Kong, Indonesia, Iran, Iraq, Ireland, Japan, Kazakhstan, Kenya, Kuwait, Latvia, Lebanon, Lithuania, Mexico, Malaysia, Mongolia, Myanmar, Nepal, Netherlands, Nigeria, Pakistan, the Philippines, Qatar, Russia, Saudi Arabia, Scotland, Serbia, South Korea, Spain, Sri Lanka, Taiwan, Thailand, Turkey, Ukraine, the United States and Zambia.
 Degree attainment typically takes three years in Albania, Australia, Bosnia and Herzegovina, the Caribbean, Iceland, India, Israel, Italy, New Zealand, Norway, South Africa (certain degrees), Switzerland, the Canadian province of Quebec, the United Kingdom (except Scotland) and most of the European Union. In Bangladesh, three-year BA (associates) courses are also available.

Definition 
The Bachelor of Arts (BA) degree is an undergraduate postsecondary degree that puts a focus on liberal arts and studies. In comparison, a Bachelor of Science (BS) has a greater focus on science, math, and engineering. The Bachelor of Arts degree is a type of baccalaureate degree. A Bachelor of Arts degree is usually completed in four years because it requires four years of full-time coursework to earn. However, just as with other degrees, some may require a longer time period. This is due to factors such as the student's ability, motivation, and access to financial assistance to earn the degree. Just like other baccalaureate degrees, a Bachelor of Arts is traditionally offered only at public and private four-year universities and colleges. A Bachelor of Arts, just like other bachelor's degrees is an admission requirement for graduate and professional school. Beginning in the 1990s, community colleges started to confer their own baccalaureate degrees. In addition to the standard BA degrees, there are career-specific Bachelor of Arts degrees, including Bachelor of Arts in Administration, Bachelor of Arts in Interdisciplinary Studies, and Regents Bachelor of Arts.

History 
The Bachelor of Arts degree has been prominent in academics for centuries. It influenced universities to begin focusing on broad topics such as algebra, psychology, biology, art, history, and philosophy.

This aspect of the BA degree has been consistent in its history. The creation of the Bachelor of Arts degree was formed out of the study of liberal arts. Liberal art is a term that was applied to the study of many branches of learning such as grammar, logic, rhetoric, arithmetic, geometry, astronomy, and music. The study of liberal arts started during the Middle Ages. During the Renaissance, the term liberal art was meant to describe general studies more broadly. This definition of liberal studies remains to this day.

In the United States, Bachelor of Arts degrees were historically given only by four-year public or private institutions and colleges. In the 1990s, other colleges like community colleges began awarding their own Bachelor of Arts degrees. Many online colleges now offer Bachelor of Arts degrees.

Degrees in Europe

Germany
In Germany, university-level education usually happens in either a Universität (plural: Universitäten) or a Fachhochschule (plural: Fachhochschulen); both can be referred to as a Hochschule, which is the generic term in Germany for all institutions awarding academic degrees. Fachhochschule is often translated as "University of Applied Sciences". Universitäten place greater emphasis on fundamental science and background in theory, while Fachhochschulen are generally designed with a focus on teaching professional skills. Degrees earned at Universitäten and Fachhochschulen are legally equivalent.

In Germany, the BA course normally lasts between three and three and a half years—six or seven semesters—and the degree is awarded after the student earns between 180 and 210 ECTS.

Netherlands
In the Netherlands, the BA and Master of Arts (MA) degrees were introduced in 2002. Until then, a single program led to the doctorandus degree (abbreviated drs.), which comprised the same course load as the bachelor's and master's programs combined. The title doctorandus was used in almost all fields of study; other titles were used for legal studies (meester, Dutch for master, abbreviated Mr.) and engineering (ingenieur, abbreviated ir. for academic masters level or ing. for higher vocational bachelors level). Those who had already started the doctorandus program could, on completing it, opt for the doctorandus degree (entitling them to use "drs." in front of their name) or could use the master's degree (postnominal letters) in accordance with the new standard. When attaining a master level/graduate degree, it is still customary to use either drs. pre-nominally or MA/MSc post-nominally at the discretion of the holder.

United Kingdom and Ireland

In the United Kingdom (excluding Scotland) and Ireland, the first degree course normally lasts three years, but nomenclature varies: 19th-century and later universities usually distinguish between arts and sciences subjects by awarding either a BA or BSc degree. However, some older or ancient universities, such as Oxford, Cambridge and Dublin traditionally award BAs to undergraduates having completed the final examinations, e.g., Part II Tripos (Cambridge), Final Honour Schools (Oxford), Moderatorship (Dublin), in most subjects including the sciences. Some new plate glass universities established in the 1960s, such as York and Lancaster originally followed the practice of Oxford and Cambridge by awarding BAs in all subjects, but have since changed to awarding BSc degrees in science subjects. At Oxford, Cambridge, and Dublin the degree of MA can be claimed, usually twenty-one terms after matriculation. For many centuries, the bachelor's degree was an intermediate step and was awarded for much of the work carried out in later times at secondary schools. The names of the final secondary school exams in France and Spain (and increasingly in the UK—the International Baccalaureate) come from this: le Baccalauréat and el Bachillerato, respectively.

The ancient universities of Scotland award a Master of Arts degree to humanities or arts graduates, but a BSc to science graduates. This course takes four years for an honours degree and three for an ordinary. In Scotland, it is possible to opt to take an ordinary degree rather than this simply ranking below a third class honours (for example, BA with distinction, merit or pass).

A Bachelor of Arts is entitled to the designation BA for an ordinary/pass degree and BA (Hons) for an honours degree. Students who completed an honours BA sometimes style themselves by '(Hon)' or '(Hons)' after the degree abbreviation in parentheses. An honours degree is always awarded in one of four classes depending upon the marks gained in the final assessments and examinations. The top students are awarded a first-class degree, followed by an upper second-class degree (usually referred to as a 2:1), a lower second-class degree (usually referred to as a 2:2), and those with the lowest marks gain a third-class degree. An ordinary or unclassified degree (which does not give the graduate the right to add '(Hons)') may be awarded if a student has completed the full honours degree course but has not obtained the total required passes sufficient to merit a third-class honours degree. Typically these degrees lack the final year requirement of a dissertation.

Degrees in North America

Canada
Education in Canada is controlled by the provinces and can be very different depending on the province. While all Canadian universities offer four-year degrees, it is not uncommon, depending on the province and the university for a three-year general degree to also be offered as an option. In many universities and colleges, Bachelor of Arts degrees are differentiated either as BA or as honours BA degrees. Honours programs require more education than non-honours programs, typically a specialization beyond the requirements of a BA, and can often be used as a gateway to a Ph.D. program, bypassing a master's degree.

United States 
Along with the BS or Bachelor of Science, the Bachelor of Arts is the most commonly granted degree in the US. A BA degree is earned after the completion of four years of undergraduate college level study. Most US colleges and universities offer undergraduate programs.

Degrees in Australia, New Zealand, Nepal and South Africa

In colleges and universities in Australia, New Zealand, Nepal, and South Africa, the BA degree can be taken over three years of full-time study. Students must pursue at least one major area of study and units from that subject are usually studied in each year, though sometimes students may choose to complete upper-level classes in the same year and as a result, can leave space for elective subjects from a different field. At some universities, students may choose to pursue a second major; alternatively, the remainder of the degree is taken up with a minor area of study (in the first two years) and other individual or stream-based subjects. Honours is an additional year of study after the BA degree, that combines aspects of undergraduate study with those of postgraduate research. Entry to the honours program is usually highly selective.

See also
 Associate of Arts
 Bachelor of Business Administration
 Bachelor of Applied Arts
 Bachelor of Fine Arts
 Bachelor of Independent Studies
 Bachelor of Science
 Lady Literate in Arts
 Master of Arts
 Educational attainment in the United States

References 
 

Arts, Bachelor of
Liberal arts education